Sherlock Yarde (unknown  –  21 June 2012) was a football administrator and former manager of the Barbados national football team.

He was the president and manager of the Clayton Kola Tonic Notre Dame football club, a senior vice-president of the Barbados Football Association, chairman of selectors for the senior team and a former national team manager. He died in June 2012, aged 55, in the Queen Elizabeth Hospital, Bridgetown, Barbados.

References

2012 deaths
Barbados national football team managers
Date of birth unknown
Place of birth unknown
Barbadian football managers